Mikhail Yekimov (born 23 May 1865, date of death unknown) was a Russian equestrian. He competed in the individual dressage event at the 1912 Summer Olympics.

References

External links
 

1865 births
Year of death missing
Russian male equestrians
Olympic equestrians of Russia
Equestrians at the 1912 Summer Olympics
Place of birth missing